Steve Nesin (born 17 April 1960) is a Canadian former soccer player who played at both professional and international levels as a striker.

Early and personal life
Nesin was born in Novi Sad, SFR Yugoslavia.

Career

Club career
Nesin played in the NASL for the Vancouver Whitecaps and the San Diego Sockers, also representing the latter in the Major Indoor Soccer League.

International career
Nesin earned three caps for the Canadian national side in 1986.

References

1960 births
Living people
Footballers from Novi Sad
Naturalized citizens of Canada
Canadian soccer players
Canada men's international soccer players
Vancouver Whitecaps (1974–1984) players
San Diego Sockers (NASL) players
San Diego Sockers (original MISL) players
North American Soccer League (1968–1984) players
North American Soccer League (1968–1984) indoor players
Major Indoor Soccer League (1978–1992) players
Canada men's youth international soccer players
Serbian emigrants to Canada
Yugoslav emigrants to Canada

Association football forwards